The inaugural 2005 European Mixed Curling Championship was held from October 18 to 22, 2005 at the Canillo Ice Arena in Canillo, Andorra.

Finland, skipped by Markku Uusipaavalniemi, won its first title, defeating Sweden in the final.

Teams
The teams are as follows:

Round Robin
In every group: two best teams to playoffs.

Group A

 Teams to playoffs

Group B

 Teams to playoffs

Group C

 Teams to playoffs

Group D

 Team to playoffs
 Teams to tie-break for 2nd place

Tie-break

Playoffs

Quarterfinals

Semifinals

Bronze medal game

Final

Final standings

References

 
2005 in curling
2005 in Andorran sport
European Mixed Curling Championship
International curling competitions hosted by Andorra
October 2005 sports events in Europe
Canillo